Kate Bazeley is a Canadian road running athlete competing in various long-distance events. In 2016, she set a new record in the Tely 10 for women with a time of 55:34. She has won the Tely 10 numerous times over her career. Kate regularly travels across Canada to compete in other national road running events.

References

Living people
Canadian female long-distance runners
Canadian female marathon runners
Sportspeople from St. John's, Newfoundland and Labrador
Year of birth missing (living people)
21st-century Canadian women